Edoardo Agnelli (9 June 1954 – 15 November 2000) was the eldest child and only son of Gianni Agnelli, the industrialist patriarch of Fiat S.p.A., and of Marella Agnelli, who was born Donna Marella Caracciolo di Castagneto. He converted to Islam when he was living in New York City, and changed his name to Mahdi. In mid-November 2000, he was found dead under a bridge on the outskirts of Turin.

Biography 
Agnelli was born in New York City to Italian parents; his maternal grandmother was American. His mother, Marella Agnelli, and his father, Gianni Agnelli, married in 1953. He had one sister, Margherita Agnelli de Pahlen. He had studied at the Liceo Classico Massimo d'Azeglio in Turin, at Atlantic College in the Vale of Glamorgan in south Wales, and he read modern literature in Latin and Eastern philosophy at Princeton University. At the age of twenty-two, he argued in the press with Margherita Hack, defending the values of astrology.

After leaving Princeton, Agnelli traveled to Kenya, Iran, and India, where he met Sathya Sai Baba and pursued his interest in Eastern religions and mysticism. He was known by his friends in New York as "Crazy Eddy" due to his restless adolescence and wild behavior. For his anti-capitalist and religious views, including criticism of capitalism in an interview following the Peace March of Assisi, he was seen as a rebel and an heretic. According to La Repubblica, Agnelli's preoccupations became increasingly erratic, lecturing about mysticism, Franciscanism, and Buddhism, praising of the poor, and criticism of the behavior of Fiat. According to The Guardian, his views opposed to economic materialism made him move in a different direction than his parents.

As an adult, Agnelli was being groomed to be the heir apparent to the Fiat empire. In the night of 27 October 1986, he made public his disagreement with his father and proclaimed himself ready to take "all the responsibilities that belong to the ownership of a large group like ours"; his father, who had already been unhappy with his conversion to Islam, ensured that he would not inherit it. The only official position that the younger Agnelli held in the family businesses was as a director of Juventus F.C. In doing so, he continued the tradition of the Fiat-owner family dating back to the 1920s. In this capacity, he was present at the Heysel disaster. In 1990, he was accused for heroin possession in Malindi; the charges were later dropped.

Conversion to Islam 

Agnelli converted to Sunni Islam in an Islamic centre in New York where he was named Hisham Aziz. He then met Ali Khamenei in Teheran and was reported to have converted to Shia Islam. According to Mohammad Hassan Ghadiri Abyaneh, Agnelli recited his shahada in front of Fakhreddin Hejazi, became a Shia Muslim, and changed his name to Mahdi. He said: "One day while I was in New York, I was walking in a library and Quran caught my glimpse. I was curious about what was in it. I started reading it in English and I felt that those words were holy words and cannot be the words of men. I was really touched and borrowed the book and studied it further and I felt like I was understanding it and I believed it."

Death 
On 15 November 2000, 46-year-old Agnelli's body was found near Turin, on a river bed beneath a motorway viaduct on which his car was found. The viaduct is known as the bridge of suicides. According to a report by Marco Ellena, the doctor from the public health office of nearby city Cuneo, who examined Agnelli's body, said: "He died because of deadly wounds after having fallen 80 meters." The report also stated that he was alive when his body impacted with the ground. His head, face, and chest were damaged due to the fall and an autopsy detected some internal injuries, which seemed to prove the suicide theory. Nothing was unusual in his death scene and police did not find anything in his car apart from phones, cigarettes, a walking stick, an address book, and a bottle of water. His conversion to Islam and the fast process of his funeral thereafter started some rumors about his suicide. Riccardo Bausone, the public prosecutor who was working on the case, closed the investigation and concluded that Agnelli's death was a suicide. His father joined police at the scene; he was reported to not have cried once he learned about Agnelli's death but was devastated.

Giuseppe Puppo, an Italian journalist and writer, published a book about Agnelli's death in 2009, using interviews and unpublished testimonies. Puppo regards some of the points as inconsistencies and oddities: the absence of the bodyguards of Edoardo Agnelli; the interval of two hours between leaving home and arriving on the Fossano viaduct; the cameras of Agnelli, whose images have never been released; the telephone traffic on the two phones; the total absence of witnesses along a road section that recorded at least eight cars per minute at that time; the lack of fingerprints on the car; and the hurried burial without a proper autopsy. He was buried next to his cousin, Giovanni Alberto Agnelli, in his family vault in the cemetery perched above the grounds of the Agnelli family villa at Villar Perosa. Giorgio Agnelli, the second son of Virginia Agnelli (born Donna Virginia Bourbon del Monte) and the elder Edoardo Agnelli, did not participate in the family business due to a serious illness and died by suicide at the age of 36 in 1965. Both Edoardo and Giorgio Agnelli were described as caring about their family and suffered from being marginalized.

Notes

References

Bibliography

Further reading

External links 

 Edoardo Agnelli (in English) at Gale
 Edoardo Agnelli (in English) at HighBeam Research
 Edvardo.com (in Persian)
 Iranfocus.com article (in English)
 Iranians Form Secular Party in Exile (in English)
 The Telegraph article, 17 November 2000 (in English)
 The Times article (in English)

1954 births
2000 deaths
2000 suicides
Edoardo 3
American people of Italian descent
Bourbon del Monte family
Converts to Islam
Converts to Shia Islam from Sunni Islam
Fiat people
House of Caracciolo
Italian Shia Muslims
Italian Muslims
Juventus F.C. directors
People educated at Atlantic College
People from New York City
Princeton University alumni
Suicides by jumping in Italy